Bisley may refer to:

Places in England
Bisley, Gloucestershire
Bisley, Surrey
National Shooting Centre, also known as Bisley Ranges, near the Surrey village

Surname
John Bisley (disambiguation)
Simon Bisley, British comic book artist
Mary Caroline Bisley, memoirist of early settler life in New Zealand
Steve Bisley (born 1951), Australian actor

Other
Bisley, the initial name for the ground attack version of the Bristol Blenheim bomber of World War II
Bisley (solitaire), a solitaire card game
a variant of the Colt Single Action Army revolver
 an office furniture manufacturer founded in Surrey, England in 1931